Crustacés & Coquillages ( "Crustaceans & shellfish") is a 2005 French comedy-drama film written and directed by Olivier Ducastel and Jacques Martineau. It is released in Northern America as Côte d'Azur and in the United Kingdom and Ireland as Cockles & Muscles.

Plot
Marc has inherited the house of his late aunt on the Côte d'Azur and takes the family there on for their summer holiday, leaving their home in Paris. Charly, who has never had a girlfriend, is thought to be gay by his parents and Martin, who is gay, is also staying with them. Béatrix's lover Mathieu arrives in the village and manages to sneak opportunities to be with her. When Martin goes out one night to the local gay cruising area (an old fort on a nearby hillside) Charly follows him and meets Didier. After realizing he isn't gay, he calls Didier for help when the hot water stops working. Didier then meets Marc and they realize how much they missed each other from when Marc used to visit the area in his youth. Throughout everyone eats much fruits de mer, especially sea violets. At the end everyone sings a song called "Fruits de mer", each with their preferred partner.

Cast
Valeria Bruni-Tedeschi – Béatrix
Gilbert Melki – Marc, her husband
Jean-Marc Barr – Didier, a local plumber and Marc's former lover
Jacques Bonnaffé – Mathieu, Béatrix's lover
Romain Torres – Charly, son of Béatrix and Marc
Édouard Collin – Martin, Charly's friend
Sabrina Seyvecou – Laura, daughter of Béatrix and Marc
Julien Weber – Sylvain, boyfriend of Martin

Critical response
The film received mixed reviews from critics. The review aggregator Rotten Tomatoes reported that 51% of critics gave the film positive reviews, based on 51 reviews, with an average score of 5.6/10. The site's consensus reads, "This listless, albeit sexually charged, French farce is too lightweight to make any impact despite its whimsical qualities.". Metacritic reported the film had an average score of 47 out of 100, based on 19 reviews, indicating "mixed or average reviews".

Accolades

References

External links

2000s musical comedy films
2000s romantic musical films
2005 films
2005 LGBT-related films
2005 romantic comedy films
Bisexuality-related films
Films directed by Jacques Martineau
Films directed by Olivier Ducastel
Films set in Marseille
French LGBT-related films
French musical comedy films
French romantic comedy films
French romantic musical films
2000s French-language films
Gay-related films
LGBT-related musical comedy films
2000s French films